George Fletcher may refer to:

Sir George Fletcher, 2nd Baronet (1633–1700), English MP for Cumberland 1661–1679, 1681–1685, 1689–1700
George Fletcher (politician) (c. 1666–c. 1708), British MP for Cockermouth and Cumberland 1701–1702, 1705–1708
George Fletcher (baseball) (1845–1879), baseball player
George Fletcher (communist) (1879–1958), British communist activist and baker
George P. Fletcher (born 1939), American jurist
George Latham Fletcher (1874–1929), American jurist and politician
George Fletcher (cowboy), American cowboy and rodeo rider